A rigid bus (either a motor bus or trolleybus) is a vehicle used in public transportation services with a single, rigid chassis.  A bus of this type is to be contrasted with an articulated or bi-articulated bus, which will have two or more rigid sections linked by a pivoting joint, also with a trailer bus, which is formed out of a bus bodied semi-trailer pulled by a conventional tractor unit.

The term "rigid bus" is used mainly in British English and Australian English and usually only when distinguishing such buses from articulated buses, such as describing a fleet that includes both types.  In the case of two-axle buses, which must be single-chassis, rigid vehicles, British English often refers to such vehicles as "two-axle" buses, only using the term "rigid" when referring to vehicles with three or more axles, which can be either rigid or articulated.

The term "rigid bus" is not used in American English, where the distinction is commonly made using the term "non-articulated" bus or, when the context is clear, "standard bus".  However, the term "standard bus" can be confusing, because it is sometimes used, in other English-speaking countries,  referring to a uniform bus design developed for and by a number of European bus manufacturers, in two model generations, between the 1960s and the end of the 20th century.  The German VöV-Standard-Bus includes the Mercedes-Benz O305 and the Mercedes-Benz O405 types, each of which, in both rigid and articulated forms, was widely acquired and used by bus operators in English-speaking countries outside North America.

Rigid buses may be of either single-deck or double-deck design, and may have either two axles or multi-axles.  However, the expression "rigid bus" is seldom used to describe a double-decker bus, because very few double-decker buses have anything other than a rigid chassis.

Single-decker rigid buses are used mainly on bus lines with an average ridership (for example, as transit buses or regional buses on routes with normal levels of patronage), or as coaches.

See also 

 Bus
 High-floor
 Low-floor bus

References

External links 

Buses by type